Tina Tshamala Ngalula (born 10 May 1995) is a DR Congolese footballer who plays for TP Mazembe and the DR Congo women's national team.

International career
Ngalula capped for the DR Congo at senior level during the 2020 CAF Women's Olympic Qualifying Tournament (third round).

See also
 List of Democratic Republic of the Congo women's international footballers

References

External links

1995 births
Living people
Democratic Republic of the Congo women's footballers
Women's association football midfielders
TP Mazembe players
Democratic Republic of the Congo women's international footballers